Legionella steelei is a Gram-negative bacterium from the genus Legionella which was isolated from specimens of the respiratory tract of patients with bronchitis in California and South Australia.

References

External links
Type strain of Legionella steelei at BacDive -  the Bacterial Diversity Metadatabase

Legionellales
Bacteria described in 2012